Erik Baška (born 12 January 1994) is a Slovak former road racing cyclist, who competed as a professional from 2013 to 2022. He took up cycle racing at the age of 14, initially competing as a mountain biker before branching into road racing at the suggestion of his coach Tibor Velits, uncle of racing cyclists Martin Velits and Peter Velits.

Major results

2013
 1st  Time trial, National Under-23 Road Championships
 5th Overall Carpathian Couriers Race
1st  Points classification
1st  Combativity classification
2014
 1st Visegrad 4 Bicycle Race – GP Polski
 1st Central European Tour Košice–Miskolc
 1st Central European Tour Budapest GP
 3rd Road race, National Under-23 Road Championships
 3rd Puchar Ministra Obrony Narodowej
 6th Central European Tour Szerencs–Ibrány
2015
 1st  Road race, UEC European Under-23 Road Championships
 1st  Time trial, National Under-23 Road Championships
 1st Puchar Ministra Obrony Narodowej
 1st Stage 4 Carpathian Couriers Race
 1st Stage 3 Tour de Berlin
 2nd Poreč Trophy
 2nd Visegrad 4 Bicycle Race – GP Slovakia
2016
 1st Handzame Classic
 1st Stage 5 (TTT) Tour of Croatia
2017
 3rd Road race, National Road Championships
2018
 1st Stage 1 (TTT) Czech Cycling Tour
 2nd Trofeo Palma
 8th Trofeo Campos, Porreres, Felanitx, Ses Salines
2019
 2nd Road race, National Road Championships
 9th Overall Okolo Slovenska
2020
 2nd Road race, National Road Championships

References

External links

Slovak male cyclists
1994 births
Living people
European Games competitors for Slovakia
Cyclists at the 2015 European Games
People from Púchov District
Sportspeople from the Trenčín Region